Poj or POJ can refer to:

 Pe̍h-ōe-jī, a Romanisation system for Southern Min Chinese
 Poj Arnon, a Thai film director
 Pochak, Hormozgan, a village in Iran
 The IATA code of Patos de Minas Airport